Claire Guyot (born 28 June 1966) is a French actress and singer, known for her prolific dubbing of foreign productions. She is also artistic director of dubbing. Most notably for the famous American actresses Teri Hatcher, Sarah Michelle Gellar and Winona Ryder. Guyot has recently started to appear in theater productions. In 2010 she portrayed Donna in the musical Mamma Mia! at the Théâtre Mogador. She dubbed Ariel in the French version of Disney's 28th animated feature, "The Little Mermaid", first as both her speaking and singing voices in the original dub, then only her speaking in the 1998 version.

Voicography dubbing selective

Films 
 Kim Boggs (Winona Ryder) Edward Scissorhands 
 Tess Trueheart (Glenne Headly) Dick Tracy 
 Elizabeta (Winona Ryder) Bram Stoker's Dracula 
 Sassy (dubbed by Sally Field VO) Homeward Bound the Incredibly Journey: Lost in San Francisco 
 Paris Carver (Teri Hatcher) Tomorrow Never Dies 
 Nina Chance (Diane Lane) Murder in the White House 
 Batgirl (Alicia Silverstone) Batman & Robin 
 Annalee Call (Winona Ryder) Alien: Resurrection 
 Casey 'Cici' Cooper (Sarah Michelle Gellar) Scream 2 
 Georgia (Kate Beckinsale) Shooting Fish 
 Holly Sullivan (Christine Taylor) Wedding Singer 
 Suzanna Kaysen (Winona Ryder)  Girl, Interrupted 
 Kathryn Merteuil (Sarah Michelle Gellar) Cruel Intentions 
 Cindy Bandolini (Sarah Michelle Gellar) Harvard Story 
 Fairy Godmother (Jennifer Saunders) Shrek 2
 Daphne Blake (Sarah Michelle Gellar) Scooby-Doo and Scooby-Doo 2: Monsters Unleashed 
 Mother (Joan Cusack) Looney Tunes: Back in Action 
 Karen Davis (Sarah Michelle Gellar) The Grudge and The Grudge 2 
 Miss Bingley (Indira Varma) Love at first sight to Bollywood 
 Park Yi-jeong (Lee Seung-Shin) Lady Vengeance 
 Maureen (Kelly Reilly) Mrs. Henderson Presents 
 Jack Starbright (Alicia Silverstone) Stormbreaker 
 Brett (Sarah Michelle Gellar) Suburban Girl: A Girl on page 
 Sally O'Malley (Amy Poehler) Horton Hears a Who
 Black Widow Spider (Jane Horrocks) Corpse Bride
 Princess Darla (Amanda Waving) The Princess and the Pea
 Victoria (Olivia Williams) Valiant
 Johanna Mills (Sarah Michelle Gellar) The Return
 Tillie (Kath Soucie) The Little Engine That Could
 Abigail (Ellen Blain) Once Upon a Forest
 Cecilia Nuthatch (Yeardley Smith) We're Back! A Dinosaur's Story
 Robyn Starling (Anndi McAfee) Tom and Jerry: The Movie
 Ariel (Jodi Benson) The Little Mermaid
 Shanti (Darleen Carr) The Jungle Book (Redubbing in 1997)
 Agnes Wickfield (Sheena Easton) David Copperfield
 Mel Jones/The Other Mother (Teri Hatcher) Coraline

Series and soap operas 
 Lois Lane (Teri Hatcher)  Lois and Clark, new adventures of Superman 
 Maggie Sheffield (Nicholle Tom) The Nanny 
 Buffy Summers (Sarah Michelle Gellar) Buffy the Vampire Slayer and Angel 
 Mags Abernathy (Katie Emme McIninch) Student Bodies 
 Gloria Duran (Eva Longoria) L.A. Dragnet 
 Susan Mayer (Teri Hatcher) Desperate Housewives 
 Niobe (Indira Varma) Rome 
 Belle Black (Kirsten Storms) day and lives

Television animation
 Batgirl (Tara Strong) The New Batman Adventures
 Molly Cunningham (Janna Michaels) TaleSpin
 Sam Totally Spies!
 Mother (Meg Ryan) Adventures Magnificent of Nigueld Ohnuze and his Team

References

External links

Official website (in French)

1966 births
Living people
French musical theatre actresses
French stage actresses
French television actresses
French voice actresses
Place of birth missing (living people)
French soap opera actresses
French voice directors